The 2007 Swedish Open was the 2007 edition of the Swedish Open tennis tournament. The tournament was held from 9 July through 15 July 2007 and played on outdoor clay courts at the Båstad Tennis Stadium in 	Båstad, Sweden.

Second-seeded David Ferrer won the singles title, his second title of the year.

Finals

Singles

 David Ferrer defeated  Nicolás Almagro, 6–1, 6–2

Doubles

 Simon Aspelin /  Julian Knowle defeated  Martín García /  Sebastián Prieto, 6–2, 6–4

References

External links
Men's Singles draw
Men's Doubles draw
Men's Singles Qualification draw